Symphoricarpos albus is a species of flowering plant in the honeysuckle family known by the common name common snowberry. Native to North America, it is browsed by some animals and planted for ornamental and ecological purposes, but is poisonous to humans.

Description 
S. albus is an erect, deciduous shrub, producing a stiff, branching main stem and often several smaller shoots from a rhizome. It can spread and colonize an area to form a dense thicket. It reaches  in maximum height. The leaves are oppositely arranged on the spreading branches. The inflorescence is a raceme of up to 16 flowers. Each flower has a small, five-toothed calyx of sepals. It has pointed lobes at the mouth and the inside is filled with white hairs. The fruit is a fleshy white berry-like drupe about 1 cm wide which contains two seeds. The plant sometimes reproduces via seed but it is primarily vegetative, reproducing by sprouting from its spreading rhizome. Birds disperse the seeds after they eat the fruit.

Varieties

There are two varieties:
S. albus var. albus, native to eastern North America
S. albus var. laevigatus, native to the Pacific coast. Some botanists treat it as a distinct species, Symphoricarpos rivularis.

Distribution and habitat 
S. albus occurs across much of Canada and the northern and western United States.

It grows in shady and moist mountain and forest habitat, in woodlands and on floodplains and riverbanks. It can grow in a wide variety of habitat types. It is naturalized in parts of Britain, where it has been planted as an ornamental and cover for game animals.

Ecology 
This shrub is an important food source for a number of animals, including bighorn sheep, white-tailed deer, and grizzly bears. Livestock such as cattle and sheep readily browse it. Many birds and small mammals use it for food and cover. Pocket gophers dig burrows underneath it during the winter.

Toxicity 
The fruit and shrub are poisonous to humans, causing vomiting.

Uses 
Native Americans used the plant as medicine, soap, sometimes for food, and the wood was good for arrow shafts. In Russia, the berries are crushed in the hands and rubbed about for a soothing folk-remedy hand lotion.

This shrub is used for erosion control in riparian areas, and it is planted in ecological restoration projects on disturbed sites such as abandoned mines. Its white fruits and blue-green foliage made it popular as an ornamental plant planted around old houses of the 1890s through the 1920s like with the Vanhoutte Spirea or Bridalwreath. It is still sold by some large diverse conventional nurseries and native plant nurseries, and occasionally found in modern landscapes. It grows in full sun to full light shade and a well-drained soil that is slightly acid to well alkaline, pH range of about 6.0 to 8.5. it is easy to transplant with its fibrous, shallow root system. It fares well in U.S. Department of Agriculture hardiness zones of 2 to 7.

References

External links

Jepson Manual Treatment: var. laevigatus
University of Washington, Burke Museum

albus
Plants described in 1753
Taxa named by Carl Linnaeus
Flora of Subarctic America
Flora of Canada
Flora of the United States